The 5th Battalion, Virginia Infantry, also known as the Archer's Battalion, was raised in Virginia for service in the Confederate States Army during the American Civil War and served as infantry. It fought mostly with the Army of Northern Virginia.

The battalion completed its organization at Richmond, Virginia, in May 1861. Its six companies were raised in the counties of Brunswick, Dinwiddie, Prince George, Henrico, and Greensville.

The unit served as heavy artillery along the James River, including at Fort Huger, before being attached to General Armistead's Brigade. During June 1862, it contained 213 men, was active in the Seven Days' Battles, then disbanded in September. Many of its members transferred to the 53rd Virginia Infantry regiment.

The field officers were Lieutenant Colonel F.H. Archer, and Majors William R. Foster and John P. Wilson, Jr.

See also

List of Virginia Civil War units

References

Units and formations of the Confederate States Army from Virginia
1861 establishments in Virginia
Military units and formations established in 1861
1865 disestablishments in Virginia
Military units and formations disestablished in 1865